Austrochaperina is a genus of microhylid frogs found on New Guinea, New Britain and Australia.

Taxonomy
The genus was removed from the synonymy of Sphenophryne by Richard Zweifel in 2000. However, as currently defined, it might not be monophyletic, with two monophyletic units of Austrochaperina more closely related to parts of Copiula than with each other.

Description
Austrochaperina are rather generalized frogs in their morphology and appear mostly to inhabit leaf litter. They reach maximum sizes between  snout–vent length. Finger and toe tips are flattened and disc-like. Most species lack toe webbing.

Species
The following species are recognised in the genus Austrochaperina:

The AmphibiaWeb includes a few additional species that Peloso and colleagues moved to Copiula in 2016.

References

 
Microhylidae
Amphibians of Oceania
Amphibian genera